Royal Astronomy is the fifth studio album by English electronic music producer Mike Paradinas under the stage name μ-Ziq, released on 26 July 1999 by Hut Records and Astralwerks.

Critical reception

Jon Dolan of Spin described Royal Astronomy as Paradinas' "most ambitious work to date: a bold stab at classicism steeped in lush orchestrations that can be anything from sweetly elegiac to darkly bizarre—as if the embattled soul conducting the musicians is being torn between millennial nightmares and wistful visions of empires past." Sarah Zupko of PopMatters called it "the most advanced and adventurous work of his career."

NME named Royal Astronomy the 38th best album of 1999.

Track listing

Charts

References

Further reading

External links
 

1999 albums
Mike Paradinas albums
Astralwerks albums